The Order of the Great Siberian Ice March was established on February 11, 1920 by order of the White Russian Commander of the Eastern Front forces, Major-General Sergei Wojciechowski. The decoration was awarded only to individuals who had participated in the Great Siberian Ice March.  The number of awards was limited by the number of soldiers and refugees that came to Transbaikalia from the Eastern Front. 

Military awards and decorations of Russia
Awards established in 1920